T'aet'an County is a county in South Hwanghae province, North Korea.

Administrative divisions
T'aet'an county is divided into 1 ŭp (town) and 15 ri (villages):

References

Counties of South Hwanghae